Cedar Park High School (CPHS) is a high school in Cedar Park, Texas. It was established in 1998 to serve as the second high school in the Leander Independent School District due to the rapid growth in the area.

The school's mascot is the Timberwolf, and the colors of CPHS are Forest Green, Silver, and Black. Cedar Park High School competes in UIL district.  CPHS is well known for the performance of its football team, drill team, choir, and Timberwolf Band.

Organizations and athletics

Football
For the 2009 football season, the Cedar Park Timberwolves football team competed in the 16-5A district. They were District Champions.  They were also District Champions in the 2010 season. Cedar Park also won 15-5A team championships in 2004–2005 with District W-L Record 7–0. In the 2011 season the Timberwolves were district runners-up to eventual state champions Lake Travis, Cedar Park had a 6-1 district record. Competing in 25-4A, along with the other LISD schools, the team was 2012 UIL 4A (Division 2) state finalist. After the final playoff game on December 21, 2012, Cedar Park became the 2012 State Champions. In 2014, Cedar Park went to the state championship once (in UIL 5A division 2) again and became runner-up in the state. After an undefeated season and play-off run, on December 19, 2015, CPHS won their second state title defeating Frisco Lone Star 22–6. In 2020, Cedar Park went to the UIL 5A Division 1 state championship and became runner up in the state.

Marching Band
The Timberwolf Band has been a finalist at UIL State and Bands Of America Regional and Super Regional marching band competitions. The band is also a two-time Bands of America Marching Band Grand National Championships Finalist, placing 10th in 2010 and 5th in 2016. The Cedar Park High School Timberwolf Band was crowned the 2001 UIL State 4A Marching Band Champion and also in 2011. In 2013, the band was awarded the silver medal at the UIL 4A State Competition. In 2015, 2017, 2019 and 2021, the band was crowned the UIL 5A State Marching Band Champion. The band has also held success in local competitions such as the Texas Marching Classic. The Cedar Park High School Percussion has won multiple Lonestar Classic "State Championships," including 2011 and 2017. The Color Guard has won 1st place in the 2011 Texas Color Guard Circuit State Championship as well as several other local and state competitions. The band won their first Bands of America Championship title in 2021 at that year's BOA Waco competition. The band is a two time participant and finalist at the Bands of America Grand National Championships.

Boys' Basketball
The Cedar Park Timberwolves 2010 basketball team are District Champions 16-AAAAA. In the 2014–2015 season, the boys became the champions of district 25-AAAAA with a district record of 13–1. They made a run through the UIL playoffs that ended in the state semi-finals on March 12, 2015, in the Alamodome with a 57–46 loss to Beaumont Ozen. They ended the best season in school history with an overall record of 28–7.

Girls' Basketball
The girls' 2014-2015 basketball team tied the Georgetown Eagles for a second place spot in district 25-A. That marked their 9th consecutive year to advance to playoffs. The Lady Wolves made it to the 3rd round, right before the regional tournament, to once again face the Georgetown Eagles. The Wolves took a tough loss by three points to end the season.

In the 2020-2021 season, the Lady Timberwolves won the 5A state championship, beating Frisco Liberty 46-39. This was the first time Leander Independent School District sent a girls' basketball team to the state tournament. The following year, the team won the 5A state championship again, beating Frisco Memorial 45-40 in double overtime. The girls had a 62-game winning streak and were the first Austin-area team to have a perfect season.

Cross Country
The Cedar Park Timberwolves boys' cross country running team took eighth place at the 2008 Nike Cross National championships, and were ranked number 1 in the nation for boys' cross country as of Oct. 2, 2009. The boys' team won state in 2010.

Boys' Lacrosse
The Cedar Park Timberwolves boys' 2017 team were undefeated in the central district of Texas, but only losing to 3 out of district games. The 2008 team posted a 7-0 district record and went 16-2 overall. The team made it to the state championship weekend falling to eventual champion, Highland Park, 10-8 in the state semifinal.

Robotics 
Cedar Park High School is home to FIRST Robotics Competition team 5052. The team was started in 2014 and has gone to world championships.

Journalism 

Cedar Park High School's online newspaper, The Wolfpack, was ranked #8 for Distinguished Sites by School Newspapers Online with a total of 33 articles listed on Best of Sno in 2019. The Tracks yearbook and CPHS News Broadcast each received Bronze Stars in the 2022 ILPC ratings. In addition, the school's journalism programs have been recognized multiple times for UIL student leader awards, including Producer of the Year, Yearbook Editor of the Year, and twice for Online Newspaper Editor of the Year.

UIL Academics

The school competes in UIL Academics district 25 in speech & debate, social studies, literature, journalism, and STEM competitions. Cedar Park was the district champion team in 2022, and third at the regional meet and fourth at the state meet. The school also won the journalism team state championship in 2022.

Notable alumni
 Chris Paddack – Major League Baseball player.
Spencer Drango - National Football League player.

References

External links
Leander ISD

Educational institutions established in 1998
High schools in Williamson County, Texas
Leander Independent School District high schools
Cedar Park, Texas
1998 establishments in Texas